Paul A. MacDonald (1912 – April 27, 2006) was an American politician and lawyer from Maine. A Republican, McDonald was elected by the Maine Legislature as the 40th Secretary of State of Maine from 1961 to 1964. He was born in rural Jefferson, Maine and prior to serving as Secretary of State, served as Clerk to the Legal Affairs Committee of the Maine Legislature and as a Deputy Secretary of State. After leaving the Secretary of State position, he served as a state district court judge for decades.

References

1912 births
2006 deaths
People from Lincoln County, Maine
Maine Republicans
Secretaries of State of Maine
20th-century American politicians
20th-century American judges